Tankard is a surname. Notable people with the surname include:

Ben Tankard (born 1964), American sportsman and musician
James W. Tankard, Jr. (1941–2005), American non-fiction writer
Jeremy Tankard, British type designer
John Tankard (died 1343), Irish bishop
Meryl Tankard (born 1955), Australian dancer and choreographer

See also
Tankard (disambiguation)